Miriam “Mimi” K. Hughes (born 1945, New York City) served as the seventh U.S. Ambassador to the Federated States of Micronesia having been sworn in on August 2, 2007. A member of the Senior Foreign Service, she held the rank of Minister Counselor.  She also served as Consul General in Mexico City.

Hughes earned a BA degree in government from Barnard College.

References

American women ambassadors
People from New York City
Barnard College alumni
Ambassadors of the United States to the Federated States of Micronesia
1945 births
Living people
American consuls
United States Foreign Service personnel
21st-century American diplomats
21st-century American women